Myth of Love is a 2021 Chinese romantic comedy drama film, written and directed by Shao Yihui, produced by Xu Zheng, and starring Xu, Ma Yili, Wu Yue, and . 

The film was released in China on December 24, 2021. It attracted local attention because of its subject matter, a romantic comedy with middle aged adults as protagonists, and because of its rarity as a contemporary Shanghainese-language film.

Plot 
The film tells the story of three women in Shanghai, Miss Li (played by Ma Yili), Beibei (played by Wu Yue), Gloria (played by Ni Hongjie) and their relationship with Lao Bai (played by Xu Zheng).

References

External links 
 
 
 

Films set in Shanghai
Shanghainese-language films
Chinese drama films
2021 romantic drama films